Zeuctomorpha is a genus of fungi in the family Pleosporaceae. This is a monotypic genus, containing the single species Zeuctomorpha arecae.

References

Pleosporaceae
Monotypic Dothideomycetes genera